Events in the year 2002 in China.

Incumbents 
 General Secretary of the Chinese Communist Party - Jiang Zemin until November 15, Hu Jintao
 President – Jiang Zemin
 Premier – Zhu Rongji
 Vice President – Hu Jintao
 Vice Premier – Li Lanqing
 Congress Chairman - Li Peng
 Conference Chairman - Li Ruihuan

Governors  
 Governor of Anhui Province – Xu Zhonglin then Wang Jinshan
 Governor of Fujian Province – Xi Jinping then Lu Zhangong
 Governor of Gansu Province – Lu Hao 
 Governor of Guangdong Province – Lu Ruihua 
 Governor of Guizhou Province – Shi Xiushi 
 Governor of Hainan Province – Wang Xiaofeng 
 Governor of Hebei Province – Niu Maosheng then Ji Yunshi 
 Governor of Heilongjiang Province – Song Fatang 
 Governor of Henan Province – Li Keqiang 
 Governor of Hubei Province – Luo Qingquan 
 Governor of Hunan Province – Zhang Yunchuan 
 Governor of Jiangsu Province – Ji Yunshi then Liang Baohua
 Governor of Jiangxi Province – Huang Zhiquan 
 Governor of Jilin Province – Hong Hu 
 Governor of Liaoning Province – Bo Xilai 
 Governor of Qinghai Province – Zhao Leji 
 Governor of Shaanxi Province – Jia Zhibang  
 Governor of Shandong Province – Han Yuqun 
 Governor of Shanxi Province – Yu Youjun 
 Governor of Sichuan Province – Zhang Zhongwei 
 Governor of Yunnan Province – Xu Rongkai 
 Governor of Zhejiang Province – Chai Songyue (until October), Xi Jinping (starting October)

Events

March
 March 25 – Shenzhou 3, an unmanned Chinese spacecraft, was launched.

April
 April 15 – An Air China Boeing 767-200 crashes into a hillside during heavy rain and fog near Pusan, South Korea, killing 128.

June
 June - Discovery of the Hidden character stone (est.)

July
 July 19 – Hail kills 25 and injures hundreds in the Chinese province of Henan.

August
 August 22 – In China, the Dongting Lake floods Yueyang, forcing the evacuation of 600,000 people; the crest of the flooding from the Yangtze River is expected Sunday. Floods and landslides have killed nearly 1000 people in China, 200 in the Hunan province.

November
 November 8 – President of the People's Republic of China Jiang Zemin announced several key policies at the 16th National Congress of the Chinese Communist Party in Beijing. Although Marxism-Leninism would remain the official ideology of China, entrepreneurs and people in unconventional occupations, who are building "socialism with Chinese characteristics", would have a voice in establishing Communist Party ideology.
 November 15 – Hu Jintao becomes General Secretary of the Chinese Communist Party.

December
 December 29
 China successfully launches Shenzhou 4, the fourth unmanned launch of the Chinese Shenzhou spacecraft.
 China State Grid, a largest utility brand of world, was established.

Date unknown
Ynhanfu organization is founded in Kunming, Yunnan Province.

Births
 November 6 - Giulio Taccon, musician and actor

See also 
 List of Chinese films of 2002
 Hong Kong League Cup 2002–03

References 

 
Years of the 21st century in China
China
2000s in China
China